Robert Stanley "Butch" May, Jr. (born November 7, 1941, in Honolulu, Hawaii) is an American former volleyball player who competed in the 1968 Summer Olympics, as well as being father to multiple Olympic gold medal American beach volleyball player, Misty May-Treanor.  Butch grew up in Honolulu, Hawaiʻi and attended St. Louis School, a private school for boys.

References

1941 births
Living people
American men's volleyball players
Olympic volleyball players of the United States
Volleyball players at the 1968 Summer Olympics
Volleyball players from Honolulu